The 2006 St Helens Metropolitan Borough Council election took place on 4 May 2006 to elect members of St Helens Metropolitan Borough Council in Merseyside, England. One third of the council was up for election and the council stayed under no overall control.

After the election, the composition of the council was
Labour 23
Liberal Democrats 19
Conservative 6

Background
Before the election the Labour Party needed to gain 1 seat to regain a majority on the council that they had lost at the last election in 2004. Labour had 24 seats before the election, while the Liberal Democrats had 18 and the Conservatives had 6. Labour was able to run the council however as the Conservative mayor had agreed not to use her casting vote.

Among the councillors who were defending seats at the election was the Labour group leader Marie Rimmer in West Park ward, while the seat in Blackbrook was vacant after the death of Labour councillor Albert Smith earlier in 2006. 16 seats were up for election and as well as candidates from the three political parties who held seats on the council, there were also four candidates from the Community Action Party and one each from the British National Party and the Socialist Labour Party.

Election result
Labour remained the largest party on the council but lost one seat to the Liberal Democrats to leave the party with 23 councillors. The Liberal Democrat gain from Labour came in Town Centre ward and moved them to 19 seats on the council, however the Labour council leader Marie Rimmer held her seat in West Park with a 457-vote majority. Meanwhile, the Conservatives remained on 6 seats after holding the 2 seats they had been defending.

Following the election Liberal Democrat Brian Spencer became the new leader of the council after an agreement between the Liberal Democrats and Conservatives, with the Liberal Democrats taking 5 of the seats on the cabinet and the Conservative group leader Wally Ashcroft taking the other seat. This came after Labour rejected proposals for all three parties to share power on the council and meant Labour lost power on the council after 70 years.

Ward results

By-elections between 2006 and 2007

References

2006 English local elections
2006
2000s in Merseyside